Sarhali is a town and a municipal council in Patti subdivision of Tarn Taran district in the Indian state of Punjab.

Origins
The nearby village of Dadehar is more than 400 year old. It was created by a man named Dadehar who originated from Malwa in search of new land, along with his nephew Sarhali. Both families traveled towards Majha from Malwa across the Sutlej River. Just before sunset, Dadehar rested and chose a place he desired to live on a small hill along with his family. They agreed that Sarhali and his family would walk further north until it was dark, and eventually that would be the nephew's home.

To divide the land they also agreed that next morning from the first ray of the sun they would walk towards each other and, where they met, to draw a line to divide the land. There is a myth that Sarhali started walking slightly early, so that the division is not exactly in the middle but closer to Dadehar than Sarhali.

Notable people
Baba Gurdit Singh
Praveen Kumar Sobti - athlete, film actor, politician, and soldier
Sandhu clan - The Sandhus are found in twenty-two  villages and originated from Dadehar in the area of Block Chohla Sahib. Seventeen villages in the area of Bhakna originated from Sarhali village.

References

External links
 District Census Handbook Tarn Taran 2011 – Village and Town Wise Primary Census Abstract

Cities and towns in Tarn Taran district